Comptonia peregrina is a species of flowering plant in the family Myricaceae. It is the only extant (living) species in the genus Comptonia, although a number of extinct species are placed in the genus. Comptonia peregrina is native to eastern North America, from southern Quebec, east to Nova Scotia, south to the extreme north of Georgia, and west to Minnesota. The common name is sweetfern or sweet-fern (although it is not a fern), or in Quebec, .

Etymology
The genus Comptonia is named in honor of Rev. Henry Compton (1632-1713), bishop of Oxford.

The species name peregrina literally means one that travels. Compare the plant's Quebec French name, comptonie voyageuse: "traveling comptonia."

Description
Plants are monoecious with separate unisexual flowers. The pistillate flowers are only , but elongate when the fruits form, reaching .

Taxonomy
The species was first described, as Liquidambar peregrina, by Carl Linnaeus in 1753, in the second volume of Species Plantarum. Further on in the same volume, he described Myrica aspleniifolia as a different species (with the epithet spelt asplenifolia). In 1763, he changed his mind concerning Myrica aspleniifolia, and it became Liquidambar aspleniifolia, and so in the same genus as Liquidambar peregrina. In 1789, Charles Louis L'Héritier placed Linnaeus's original Myrica aspleniifolia in his new genus Comptonia. In 1894, John M. Coulter transferred Linnaeus's Liquidambar peregrina to Comptonia, and treated Linnaeus's Myrica aspleniifolia as a synonym. Comptonia peregrina is now the only extant (living) species in the genus.

Distribution and habitat
Comptonia peregrina is native to eastern North America, from Ontario and Quebec in the north, east to Nova Scotia, to Georgia in the south, and west to Minnesota. It tends to grow on dry sandy sites, and is associated with pine stands.

Ecology

Comptonia peregrina is used as a food plant by the larvae of some Lepidoptera species, including Bucculatrix paroptila, grey pug, setaceous Hebrew character, Io moth, and several Coleophora case-bearers: C. comptoniella, C. peregrinaevorella (which feeds exclusively on Comptonia), C. persimplexella, C. pruniella and C. serratella. It is also a non-legume nitrogen fixer.

Uses and consumption
The plant produces a bristly burr that contains 1 to 4 edible nutlets.

The aromatic leaves (fresh or dried) are also used to make a tea. The Canadian author Catharine Parr Traill includes it in her book The Female Emigrant's Guide in a list of substitutes for China tea. "When boiled," she notes, "it has a slightly resinous taste, with a bitter flavour, that is not very unpleasant." Mistaking it, like others, for a fern, she says that it is in high repute "among the Yankee and old Canadian housewifes (sic)." Tea made from the plant has been said to treat the effects of poison ivy when applied to the affected area. The plant has also been used as a seasoning.

Notes

References

External links
USDA Plants Profile for Comptonia peregrina (sweet fern)
Flora of North America: Comptonia peregrina

Myricaceae
Flora of Eastern Canada
Flora of the North-Central United States
Flora of the Northeastern United States
Flora of the Southeastern United States
Taxa named by Carl Linnaeus
Taxa named by John Merle Coulter
Plants described in 1753
Flora without expected TNC conservation status